Thomas Henry McLaughlin (July 25, 1881 – March 17, 1947) was an American prelate of the Roman Catholic Church who served as president of Seton Hall College from 1922 to 1933 and as the first bishop of the new Diocese of Paterson in New Jersey from 1937 until his death in 1947.  He previously served as an auxiliary bishop of what was then the Diocese of Newark in New Jersey from 1935 to 1937

Biography

Early life 
Thomas McLaughlin was born in New York City to John and Margaret (née Byrne) McLaughlin. His family later moved to Montclair, New Jersey, 

McLaughlin attended St. Francis Xavier College in New York City, obtaining a Bachelor of Arts degree in 1901. He then went to the University of Innsbruck in Innsbruck, Austria, where he was ordained to the priesthood for the Diocese of Newark by Bishop Balthasar Kaltner on July 26, 1904. McLaughlin earned a doctorate in sacred theology from Innsbruck in 1908.

Returning to New Jersey, McLaughlin was appointed a professor at Seton Hall College at South Orange in 1908. He served as dean from 1914 until 1922, when he was elected president of Seton Hall and rector of Immaculate Conception Seminary. He remained as president until 1933 and rector until 1938. He was named a domestic prelate in 1923, and vicar general of the archdiocese in 1933.

Auxiliary Bishop of Newark 
On May 18, 1935, McLaughlin was appointed as an auxiliary bishop of the Diocese of Newark and Titular Bishop of Nisa in Lycia by Pope Pius XI. He received his episcopal consecration on July 25, 1935, from Archbishop Thomas J. Walsh, with Bishops John A. Duffy and Joseph H. Schlarman serving as co-consecrators.

Bishop of Paterson 
Pius XI named McLaughlin as the first bishop of the newly erected Diocese of Paterson on December 16, 1937. He designated St. John the Baptist Church in Patterson as the cathedral.

Thomas McLaughlin remained as Bishop of Paterson until his death on March 17, 1947. He is buried at St. John the Baptist Cathedral Churchyard, Paterson.

References

1881 births
1947 deaths
Clergy from New York City
Seton Hall University people
University of Innsbruck alumni
20th-century Roman Catholic bishops in the United States
Roman Catholic bishops of Paterson